The R621 road is a regional road in County Cork, Ireland. It travels from the R619 at Gortnagross to the N72 at Newberry Cross.

References

Regional roads in the Republic of Ireland
Roads in County Cork